Together Again, Again is an album by saxophonist Willis Jackson with organist Brother Jack McDuff which was recorded in 1959, 1960 and 1961 and released on the Prestige label in 1966.

Reception

AllMusic awarded the album 4½ stars stating "Tenor saxophonist Jackson and organist McDuff might be the spotlighted performers in the marketing, but actually it's a pretty integrated full-band, small-group sound. There's not much original material from Jackson, though (and no original tunes from McDuff), with a New Orleans-tinged version of Hank Williams' "Jambalaya" the most unexpected cover choice".

Track listing
All compositions by Willis Jackson except where noted.
 "Gil's Pills" (John Adriano Acea) – 4:10
 "Backtrack" – 2:05
 "Without a Song" (Vincent Youmans, Billy Rose, Edward Eliscu) – 3:0
 "Snake Crawl" – 2:40
 "Angel Eyes" (Matt Dennis, Earl Brent) – 4:40
 "Dancing on the Ceiling" (Lorenz Hart, Richard Rodgers) – 4:12
 "Medley: September Song/Easy Living/Deep Purple"  (Kurt Weill, Maxwell Anderson/Ralph Rainger, Leo Robin/Peter DeRose) – 7:39
 "Jambalaya" (Hank Williams) – 4:50
Recorded at Van Gelder Studio in Hackensack, New Jersey on May 25, 1959 (tracks 1 & 5), and at Van Gelder Studio in Englewood Cliffs, New Jersey on November 9, 1959 (track 7), February 26, 1960 (track 6) and December 13, 1961 (track 2–4 & 8)

Personnel
Willis Jackson – tenor saxophone
Jack McDuff – organ
Bill Jennings – guitar
Milt Hinton (track 6), Jimmy Lewis (tracks 2–4 & 8), Wendell Marshall (track 7), Tommy Potter (tracks 1 & 5) – bass
Alvin Johnson (tracks 1 & 5–7), Frank Shea (tracks 2–4 & 8) – drums
Buck Clarke – congas (track 6)

References

Willis Jackson (saxophonist) albums
Jack McDuff albums
1966 albums
Prestige Records albums
Albums recorded at Van Gelder Studio
Albums produced by Esmond Edwards